Ghost-Spider (Gwendolyne Maxine Stacy; colloquially: Spider-Gwen), formerly Spider-Woman, is a superheroine appearing in American comic books published by Marvel Comics. She was created by Jason Latour and Robbi Rodriguez. The character debuted in Edge of Spider-Verse issue #2 as part of the 2014–15 "Spider-Verse" comic book storyline, leading to the ongoing series Spider-Gwen that began in 2015.

Spider-Woman/Ghost-Spider is a variant of Spider-Man and an alternate-universe version of Gwen Stacy. She lives on Earth-65, where Gwen Stacy is bitten by a radioactive spider and becomes a superhero instead of Peter Parker becoming Spider-Man. The character's various enemies include Earth-65 versions of Matt Murdock and Frank Castle. Gwen Stacy's Spider-Woman harbors much of Peter's personality and conflicts along with his powers and abilities.

Spider-Woman was met with positive reviews from critics, with them applauding her design—cited as a popular choice for cosplay—and a feminist perspective. For promotion, several other versions of the character were developed, accompanied by merchandise. She was also featured on animated television series and in multiple video games as a playable character. Dove Cameron voices the character in the 2018–19 Marvel Rising media franchise as "Ghost-Spider", an alias later integrated into the comics, while Hailee Steinfeld voices the character in the Spider-Verse film series; Laura Bailey, Ashley Johnson, Emily Tennant, Catherine Luciani and Allegra Clark have also provided the character's voice in other media.

Publication history

In the primary continuity of the comic books constituting the Marvel Universe, college-student Gwen Stacy was the girlfriend of Peter Parker, whom she was unaware was Spider-Man. This primary version of Gwen Stacy was killed in The Amazing Spider-Man #121 (June 1973). The concept of an alternate-universe, spider-powered Gwen Stacy was first conceptualized by longtime Spider-Man writer Dan Slott for the "Spider-Verse" story arc. Slott had suggested "Gwen Stacy as a Spider-Woman" to Spider-Man editor Nick Lowe, who then approached Jason Latour to write a series based on that character. Latour was concerned about restoring Gwen Stacy to life in even an alternate-universe form, given the canonical consequences of her death more than 40 years earlier, but eventually conceded, and approached Robbi Rodriguez to design the character. Latour prompted Rodriguez to keep her mysterious and to avoid anything that would prematurely reveal her identity, saying that she "should feel like anyone could be under that mask." Slott previously had envisioned a costume based on her clothing in the two-part death story, "The Night Gwen Stacy Died" (1973), except red and blue with web patterns and a half mask. She would also have had a trench coat that would have been red with webs. Slott ultimately approved of Rodriquez' design. The character debuted in Edge of Spider-Verse #2 on September 17, 2014 and is commonly referred to as Spider-Gwen.

Latour's inspiration for creating the character came when he realized that he was not familiar with Gwen Stacy outside of being a "fridged" character who was killed for the sake of the hero as a plot progression. Latour also felt he grew up in times when white males were dominant in superhero comics, and saw Gwen Stacy as a potential hero to represent women in a better way, "The fact that it's a woman does change the meaning and subtext of everything that's going on. As a creator, that's really enjoyable and it opens up the story to go in a lot of directions it wouldn't have gone before. In October 2014, Nick Lowe announced at New York Comic Con 2014 that the character would be getting her own ongoing series after much demand. The first issue of Spider-Gwen experienced commercial success and was the third best-selling comic of February 2015 with sales of over 250,000 copies. The first volume ended after the fifth issue, with the character carrying over into the second volume of Spider-Verse as part of the Secret Wars event. After the conclusion of the event, a second volume by the same creative team began with the first issue as a part of Marvel's All-New, All-Different Marvel imprint entitled The Radioactive Spider-Gwen. Spider-Gwen was featured as a major character in a multi-part crossover entitled Spider-Women. It commenced with Spider-Women Alpha #1 and ended with Spider-Women Omega #1, with certain issues of Spider-Woman, Silk and Spider-Gwen partially depicting the storyline in between.

Spider-Gwen also stars in a team-up with the alternate Spider-Man-themed characters from the second volume of Spider-Verse in a series titled Web Warriors, a name that was coined by Peter Parker from the Ultimate Spider-Man TV series during the original Spider-Verse. In 2016, the character starred alongside Miles Morales in a crossover storyline titled Sitting in a Tree where she gets romantically involved with Miles.

Spider-Gwen begins college on Earth-616 at the start of a new series Spider-Gwen: Ghost-Spider written by Seanan McGuire with pencils by Rosi Kämpe and later Takeshi Miyazawa. After 10 issues, the series was relaunched as simply Ghost-Spider, which ended after an additional 10 issues. The titular Ghost Spider moniker was taken from Stacy's alias in the animated franchise Marvel Rising.

In 2022, a new limited series titled Spider-Gwen: Gwen-Verse by Tim Seeley and Jodi Nishijima was published, featuring Stacy traveling through time alongside alternative versions of herself (modeled after other Marvel heroes) to correct a disruption in the timeline.

Fictional character biography

Earth-65
In the alternate reality designated Earth-65, Gwen Stacy from Midtown High School is a drummer in a band called the Mary Janes, consisting of her and her friends Mary Jane Watson, Betty Brant and Glory Grant who compete with Felicia Hardy and her band the "Black Cats". Bitten by a radioactive spider, Gwen becomes the hero Spider-Woman. Shortly afterward, her friend and classmate Peter Parker attempts to exact revenge on those who bully him, becoming Earth-65's version of the Lizard. Gwen subdues him and Peter dies due to the chemicals he used for his transformation. Spider-Woman is greatly affected by Peter's death and inspired to use her power to protect others. She is blamed for Parker's death publicly by J. Jonah Jameson. Her father, NYPD Chief George Stacy, hunts for Spider-Woman, aided by his world's Captain Frank Castle and Detective Jean DeWolff. During a later confrontation with her father, Gwen reveals her true identity to him. Shocked, he tells her to run.

In the "Spider-Verse" storyline, Gwen of Earth-65 is one of many other Spider-Totems across the multiverse recruited to fight the vampiric Morlun and the Inheritors. Although she is one of several people called Spider-Women who appear, she seems to be the only Spider who is also Gwen Stacy, leading to the nickname "Spider-Gwen." Gwen realizes most of her counterparts in other universes are dead, including the Earth-616 Gwen Stacy who was the first love of Peter Parker, leader of the group fighting the Inheritors. Telling Peter she likewise failed to save her version of him, they both agree to look out for each other. Though Gwen deals with both criminals and enemies in the police department, she also makes allies such as her Earth's versions of Captain America (Samantha Wilson), Reed Richards, and Peggy Carter, the leader of S.H.I.E.L.D.

Gwen meets Spider heroes of other worlds again on Battleworld in the Secret Wars storyline. During the crossover storyline Sitting in a Tree, she explores a possible romance with Miles Morales, but they stay as friends. Along with battling menaces on her own world, Gwen joins the Web Warriors, a group of Spiders with dimensional-travel devices who combat threats to other universes, particularly worlds that no longer have a Spider of its own to defend it. During the Dead No More: The Clone Conspiracy storyline, she poses as a clone of Earth-616 Gwen Stacy to help Peter and Kaine Parker stop a threat involving the Jackal's Carrion Virus.

After losing her powers, Gwen's seeks aid from the corrupt Matt Murdock (this universe's version of the Kingpin) and scientist Elsa Brock. It's discovered that combining the mutagenic Lizard serum with isotopes can form a version of the Venom symbiote. Gwen bonds with Elsa Brock's symbiote, restoring her abilities. When Murdock puts out a hit on her father, George, Gwen succumbs to the symbiote's baser influence and almost kills Murdock in revenge. After she spares his life, Murdock reveals he was testing to see if Gwen, like him, would be corrupted by power. After defeating Murdock, Gwen takes full control over the symbiote, reveals her identity to the public, and turns herself over to the authorities for her crimes. After turning down an offer from Captain America to perform black ops services in exchange for reduced sentencing, she is convicted for one year in a maximum security S.H.I.E.L.D. prison.

Earth-616
After serving her prison time, Gwen is informed the Inheritors have returned and joins the "Spider-Geddon" storyline. At one point, she is believed by the others to be killed in an explosion. In truth, she survives the explosion but is stranded on Earth-3109, her dimensional transportation device now damaged. The Gwen of that world, who operates as the heroic Green Goblin, creates a new dimensional teleportation device and Earth-65 Gwen returns to the fight against the Inheritors. During the final battle, Miles Morales wonders if Gwen is a ghost after seeing her lost in an explosion, inspiring the new nickname "Ghost-Spider." and later travels to Earth-90214 after the death of Spider-Man Noir to consult his loved ones while dressed as an airline pilot.

Back on Earth-65, Gwen tries to return to her normal life of superhero activities, drumming with the Mary Janes, and attempting to rekindle her relationships with friend Harry Osborn and her father George. Without her secret identity, things prove challenging, leading to judgments from the public and regular attacks by criminals like the Man-Wolf. Additionally, her symbiote starts causing massive headaches while dropping parts of itself as "gummy spiders." Since Elsa Brock has disappeared from public life, Gwen travels to Earth-616 to find her counterpart Eddie Brock. Peter Parker of Earth-616, now a teacher at Empire State University, volunteers to analyze the symbiote since his world's Eddie Brock is not a scientist. The two heroes then save people from the villain Swarm and Gwen is asked who she is. Since this universe already has a Spider-Woman, Gwen decides she needs a new name. Considering how so many of her multiverse counterparts are dead, as if "Death loves Gwen Stacy," she decides to adopt her "Ghost-Spider" nickname as a new official alias.

Realizing her secret identity is intact in this dimension, Gwen decides to attend college peacefully on Earth-616 without worrying about villains attacking. With Peter's help, she enrolls in Empire State University, explaining to school admissions that she comes from another dimension. This, along with her test records and Parker vouching for her, earns Gwen enrollment and a scholarship that applies to visitors from other worlds and dimensions. Gwen begins regularly attending classes while "commuting" back and forth from her own Earth, regularly encountering Peter. In costume, she fights menaces on both worlds, including Miles Warren, whose unhealthy obsession with the Earth-616 Gwen Stacy led to him becoming the villainous Jackal.

Collected issues

Other versions
During the 2015 "Secret Wars" storyline, a version of Spider-Woman appears in the plot of A-Force. This version resides on the Battleworld domain of Arcadia. The character saves Mary Jane Watson during an invasion of the Marvel Zombies after Arcadia's Loki had fired at the part of the Shield that was closest to Arcadia.

On Earth-8, Spider-Gwen is married to Miles Morales and is the mother of Charlotte and Max Morales, both of whom also have Spider Powers.

A version of Spider-Gwen witness Gwenpool defeat the Green Goblin and saves Gwenpool from her death. They later eat pizza together with Peter Parker, Miles Morales and Cindy Moon.

In the universe of Spider-Ham, Spider-Gwen is a penguin known as Guin Stacy the Spider-Guin. She later aids Spider-Ham and Parker Peterman in battling Spider-Ham's various villains.

In A-Babies vs X-Babies, Spider-Gwen was new to town and went to Iron Man's food truck, where he asked her to go for a date, but she refused. She then took part in the battle between the Avengers, the X-Men, the Guardians of the Galaxy and the Inhumans.

Characteristics
Gwen Stacy's Spider-Woman is depicted as harboring much of Earth-616 Peter Parker's personality and conflicts, such as receiving negative media attention of herself and having the conflict of being a superhero over her normal life of a band member. Critical commentary noted her as a sarcastic, wisecracking hero when fighting criminals and supervillains. Spider-Gwen (Vol. 2) #1's summary of the character reveals that she originally used her powers for attention. After advice expressed to Gwen Stacy by her father that Spider-Woman could use her powers for good purposes, she was motivated to stop bullying, which Peter Parker in Earth-65 was a victim of. Spider-Woman eventually became an idol to Peter and he used an experimentation on himself to become a superhero like her, leading to his demise. Gwen Stacy was branded a criminal after Peter's death, having been blamed for killing him. Jesse Schedeen of IGN felt that this aspect was the most intriguing change of her story, "[Peter Parker becomes] both Gwen's first major villain and the defining, Uncle-Ben-style tragedy in her life." Evan Narcisse from Kotaku explained that it was a role reversal that felt "enriching" to what the creators intended to do, which gave Gwen Stacy "a reason to live". After saving her father's life and revealing her identity to him, she vows to use her powers to stop crime. Captain Stacy is then depicted as choosing his daughter over his job. Meagan Damore of Comic Book Resources opined that even though Captain Stacy is no Uncle Ben, he fills the wise mentor role for Gwen very well.

Powers and abilities
Spider-Woman was originally depicted as having similar powers to Spider-Man, which originated from a bite by a radioactive spider. These powers include superhuman speed, agility, enhanced strength that enables her to lift about 10 tons, the ability to adhere to surfaces such as walls, and a precognitive "Spider-Sense" that warns her of danger. She uses web-shooters that were created by retired crime fighter and billionaire mogul Janet van Dyne. The mechanisms help filter moisture from the air to create an adhesive web-fluid, which itself creates web nets, ropes and globs, among other shapes. They also help her swing from building to building, not requiring refilling as long as moisture is present. Spider-Woman also has a wristwatch that allows her travel to the multiverse after the events of "Spider-Verse". She is commonly depicted as using her smartphone for superhero equipment. As the daughter of a police captain, Spider-Woman has developed detective skills and analytical thinking. She is not trained in fighting, but has picked up elements from kung fu films.

The character is eventually depicted as depowered, but regains her powers after bonding with her universe's version of the Venom symbiote. Her symbiote feeds off the nutrients of her body but if it does not consume the correct nutrients, Gwen's powers become unstable. To help keep her symbiote stable, Gwen often eats extra food and has made kale chips a regular part of her diet, since the symbiote responds well to cellulose.

Reception
 
Gwen Stacy's Spider-Woman has been received positively from reviewers. Her design is a popular choice for cosplay and fan art. Evan Narcisse of Kotaku called the costume design "is one of the best riffs on the Spider-Man motifs in decades." Andrew Wheeler from ComicsAlliance felt that even though Gwen Stacy should have stayed dead, the costume inspired him to want her back. He also cited it as a potential favorite superhero costume in years. The creative director of Marvel Games, Bill Rosemann, described Gwen Stacy as "one of the greatest modern superhero designs." IGN's Jesse Schedeen, reviewing the first Spider-Gwen issue, said that the character never came across as merely just a female variant of Peter Parker and was also distinct from Jessica Drew, Julia Carpenter, Mayday Parker, Anya Corazon, and other female-themed Spider costume characters. Jessie Schedeen said that Gwen had "her own set of hang-ups and her own brand of humor". Doug Zawisza, writing for Comic Book Resources, described Gwen Stacy as "likeable and humorous, conflicted but determined and quick with a zinger", adding, "Latour gives Gwen real world problems as well as superheroic ones. She has family problems and perception problems."

The character has drawn critical attention on a feminist perspective. Aja Romano of The Daily Dot felt that the new take on Gwen Stacy was a fresh one on its original version due to a common trope of women dying for the sake of men's angst. She praised the fact that instead of taking the role of a superhero's girlfriend, Latour designed her as a "fully formed person." Entertainment Weekly Joshua Rivera felt that "Spider-Gwen succeeds because it isn't a superficial inversion, but an examination of what makes Spider-Man an important character." Gwen Stacy's Spider-Woman was number seven in Newsaramas list of the best Spider-Men. Ryan Lynch of Screen Rant called her the second-greatest alternate version of Spider-Man, saying that her stories were "a unique take on the Spider-mythos that provided unique stories based on fleshed out characters with clever writing." Chris Sims from ComicsAlliance ranked her as the second-best alternate take on Spider-Man. Mark Ginnochio, writing for Comicbook.com, said the character's debut was the fourth-best alternate Spider-Man story, and that even though Gwen Stacy was a new character she was on her way to establishing herself as one of the most popular superheroes of Marvel.

In 2022, Screen Rant included Gwen Stacy / Spider-Gwen in their "10 Female Marvel Heroes That Should Come To The MCU" list.

In other media

Television
 Spider-Gwen appears in the Ultimate Spider-Man episode "Return to the Spider-Verse" Pt. 4, voiced by Dove Cameron. After Miles Morales vanished from her universe, Gwen Stacy allied with her universe's May Parker to become Spider-Woman and reign in the chaos that befell her city using technology to mimic Morales' spider powers. Morales later returns with the "prime" version of Peter Parker and join forces with Gwen to defeat Wolf Spider. She is later chosen by Morales to continue being their universe's Spider hero while the Morales family move to Parker's universe.
 Spider-Gwen / Ghost-Spider appears in Marvel's Spider-Man, voiced by Laura Bailey. This version is one of Peter Parker's classmates at Horizon High, as well as best friends with Anya Corazon, who specializes in DNA formulas after she was inspired by her uncle Raymond Warren to pursue science. Later in the series, she develops spider powers after being exposed to Warren's chemicals, with admirers referring to her as "Spider-Gwen" after adopting her comic book costume sans mask. Though she temporarily loses her powers, she later regains them and adopts the Ghost-Spider alias after adding a mask to her costume.
 Spider-Gwen appears in Marvel Super Hero Adventures, voiced by Emily Tennant.
 Ghost-Spider appears in the Marvel Rising animated media franchise, voiced again by Dove Cameron. While this version is primarily based on Stacy, she uses an alias that originated in the comics as a Ghost Rider variant of Spider-Man and has the partially dyed pink hair of Gwen Poole in her civilian identity. This redesign was cited by a Marvel Rising character designer, who mistook an image of Gwen Poole by Gurihiru for Gwen Stacy while using Google Images to reference the former character's physical appearance during the series' development. The "Ghost-Spider" alias was later integrated into Marvel Comics and related animated Spider-Man media to distinguish the character from other Spider-Women.
 Stacy first appears in the Initiation shorts, in which she goes on the run from the police after she is blamed for the death of her Inhuman friend, Kevin. Eventually, S.H.I.E.L.D. agent Daisy Johnson finds similar reports of the suspect in question and gives the information to Ghost-Spider.
 Ghost-Spider returns in the TV special "Chasing Ghosts", in which she tracks down Sheath, a female Inhuman responsible for Kevin's death, and works with the Secret Warriors to stop her before eventually joining the team.
 Ghost-Spider appears in Lego Marvel Spider-Man: Vexed by Venom, voiced again by Laura Bailey. This version's design and portrayal is a combination of her counterparts from Marvel's Spider-Man and Marvel Rising.
 Ghost-Spider appears in Marvel's Spidey and His Amazing Friends, voiced by Lily Sanfelippo. Like the Marvel Rising incarnation, this series' Gwen Stacy has Gwen Poole's partially dyed pink highlights.

Film

 Spider-Gwen appears in Spider-Man: Into the Spider-Verse (2018), voiced by Hailee Steinfeld. This version has operated as Spider-Woman for two years, saved her father, but failed to save her friend Peter Parker after he became the Lizard, before being pulled into Miles Morales' dimension due to the Kingpin's Super-Collider. Following her spider-sense, she poses as a student at Morales' school to find the dimension's spider hero. Stacy later arrives at Alchemax, where Morales and Peter B. Parker are stealing information that can help send them home. She intervenes in time to secure the data and save the pair from Doctor Octopus before joining them and three other Spider-People to stop the Kingpin. She participates in the final battle at the Super-Collider, where Morales proves himself and helps her and the other Spider-People return to their respective home dimensions. In an epilogue, Stacy contacts Morales from "another another" dimension.
 Spider-Gwen will return in the sequel Spider-Man: Across the Spider-Verse (2023), with Steinfeld reprising her role.
 Spider-Gwen will also appear in a female-centered spin-off of Spider-Man: Into the Spider-Verse.

Video games
 Spider-Gwen appears as an unlockable playable character in: 
 Spider-Man Unlimited, voiced again by Laura Bailey.
 Marvel: Contest of Champions.
 Marvel: Avengers Alliance.
 Marvel Heroes, voiced by Ashley Johnson.
 Marvel Future Fight.
 Marvel Puzzle Quest.
 Marvel Avengers Academy, voiced by Catherine Luciani.
 Lego Marvel Super Heroes 2, voiced by Melli Bond.
 Spider-Gwen appears as a playable character in Marvel Ultimate Alliance 3: The Black Order, voiced by Allegra Clark.
 Spider-Gwen's suit, based on her appearance in Spider-Man: Across the Spider-Verse, appears as an alternate skin in Fortnite.

Legacy
The character inspired 20 Marvel variant covers of Gwen Stacy being a wide array of Marvel heroes (and one for the Image Comics series Invincible and its title character), one of such hybrids inspiring the character Gwen Poole. A rock band named Married With Sea Monsters drew inspiration from Spider-Woman for their track "Face It Tiger", which was based on a song sung by Spider-Gwen's fictional band The Mary Janes. The character's popularity has spawned merchandise, including shirts and action figures of the superhero. Figures have been sold to companies such as Diamond Comic Distributors and Hasbro, among others. In addition, Funko released bobblehead figures of the character, while in Australia, Harley Davidson has teamed up with Marvel to create custom hero-themed motorcycles including a design based on Spider-Gwen.

References

External links

 Spider-Woman (Gwen Stacy) at Marvel Wiki

Alternative versions of Spider-Man
Comics characters introduced in 2014
Fictional ballet dancers
Fictional characters from parallel universes
Fictional characters from New York City
Fictional characters with precognition
Fictional college students
Fictional high school students
Marvel Comics American superheroes
Marvel Comics characters who can move at superhuman speeds
Marvel Comics characters with accelerated healing
Marvel Comics characters with superhuman strength
Marvel Comics child superheroes
Marvel Comics female superheroes
Marvel Comics mutates
Spider-Woman
Vigilante characters in comics
Fictional female musicians
Fictional rock musicians
Teenage superheroes